1100 Bel Air Place is an album of love songs performed by Spanish singer Julio Iglesias, released on 10 August 1984 by CBS Records internationally and by Columbia Records in the United States. It was the first of Iglesias' albums to be performed largely in English, and it is generally considered his breakthrough album in English-speaking markets.

The album features Iglesias' only US top-40 singles, "To All the Girls I've Loved Before", with Willie Nelson, and "All of You" with Diana Ross. The Beach Boys performed backing vocals on "The Air That I Breathe", a song from Albert Hammond's 1972 album It Never Rains in Southern California, which was also a major hit for the British band the Hollies in 1974.

The album's title is the address, 1100 Bel Air Place—Iglesias' former home in Los Angeles, which was owned by music producer Quincy Jones until September 2005.

Promotion 

To promote 1100 Bel Air Place, Julio Iglesias began a world tour on 15 June 1984 in Puerto Rico. The tour totaled 124 concerts throughout the United States, Canada, Europe, South Africa, Australia and the Orient. The tour was sponsored by Coca-Cola and sold around 1 million tickets.

Track listing

Personnel
Adapted from the 1100 Bel Air Place liner notes:

Performance credits

Vocals
Julio Iglesias
Diana Ross
Willie Nelson
The Beach Boys

Keyboards, Rhodes, Synthesizers
Randy Kerber
Michel Colombier
Robbie Buchanan
David Foster
Greg Phillinganes
James Newton Howard
Rafael Ferro
John Barnes
John Van Tongeren
Steve Mitchell
Nicky Hopkins
Michael Boddicker

Guitars
Michael Landau
David Williams
Paul Jackson Jr.
George Doering

Drums
Carlos Vega

Bass
Abraham Laboriel
Nathan East
Mike Porcaro
Neil Stubenhaus

Percussion
Paulinho da Costa
Luis Conte
Michael Fisher

Trumpets
Jerry Hey
Gary Grant
Larry Hall
Chuck Findley
Charles Davis

Trombones
Charles Loper
Lew McCreary
Dick Hyde
Dick Nash
Les Benedict
Bill Reichenbach

French Horns
Richard Todd
Brad Warnaar

Background Vocals
Tom Kelly
Richard Page
Steven George
Richard Marx
Kenny Cetera
Julia Waters
Maxine Waters
Stephanie Spruill
Alexandra Brown

Violins
Gerald Vinci
Assa Drori
Arnold Belnick
Isabelle Daskoff
Henry Ferver
Reg Hill
Kathy Lenski
Haim Shtrum
Marshall Sosson
Mary Tsumura
Bobb Sushel
Bob Sanov
Bill Nuttycombe
Joe Goodman
Shari Zippert
Stanley Plummer
Bill Hymanson
Sheldon Sanov

Viola
Dave Schwartz
Allan Harshman
Stan Ackerman
Virginia Majewski
Marilyn Baker
Garey Nuttycombe
Myer Bello
Pamela Goldsmith

Cello
Fred Seydora
Ray Kelley
Douglas Davis
Jacqueline Lustgarten
Larry Corbett
Ron Cooper
David Speltz

Horns
Erich Bulling

Saxophone solo
Stan Getz ("When I Fall In Love")

Technical credits

Richard Perry – producer
Michel Colombier – arranger (tracks, strings)
Randy Kerber – arranger (tracks, strings)
Robbie Buchanan – arranger (tracks)
Ramón Arcusa – arranger (tracks), producer
John Barnes – arranger (tracks)
Jeremy Lubbock – arranger (strings)
Erich Bulling – arranger (horns)
Jules Chaikin – contractor
John Rosenberg – contractor
Andres Victorin – copyist
Art Von Schloss – copyist
Suzie Katayama – copyist
Humberto Gatica – engineer, mixer
Terry Christian – engineer
Gabe Veltri – additional engineer
Bill Scheniman – additional engineer (Diana's voice)
Larry Greenhill – additional engineer (Willie's voice)
Stuart Furusho – additional engineer
Tom Fource – additional engineer
Larry Fergusson – additional engineer
Michael Brooks – additional engineer
David Dubow – assistant engineer
Bobby Gerber – assistant engineer
Wally Traugott – mastering engineer
Albert Hammond – associate producer
Harry Langdon – cover photos
Javier Paz – design
Julie Adams – dialect coach for the album   
Lillian Glass – dialect coach for ("To All The Girls I've Loved Before")

Recording and mixing locations

Studio 55, Los Angeles – recording
Sunset Sound, Los Angeles – recording, mixing
Lion Share, Los Angeles – recording
Record Plant, Los Angeles – recording
Ocean Way, Los Angeles – recording
Lighthouse, Los Angeles – recording
Pedernales, Austin – recording
The Power Station, New York – recording
The Hit Factory, New York – recording
Capitol Records – mastering

Charts

Weekly charts

Year-end charts

Certifications and sales

References

Bibliography

 

1984 albums
Albums produced by Richard Perry
CBS Records albums
Columbia Records albums
Julio Iglesias albums
Legacy Recordings albums